Suffolk was launched in 1795 at Newcastle. In 1800 she made one voyage for the British East India Company (EIC). She traded widely as different owners deployed her on one route or another.

Captain John Luke acquired a letter of marque on 22 November 1800. Messrs. Princep and Saunders had tendered Suffolk, John Luke, master, to the EIC to bring back rice from Bengal. She was one of 28 vessels that sailed on that mission between December 1800 and February 1801. 

 

Suffolk sailed on 25 December 1800 and returned on 28 February 1802.

Lloyd's List reported on 25 February 1825 that Suffolk, Allison, master, had been blown out of Madeira on 25 January and that she had not returned by the 28th.

Following the resumption of war with France in early 1803, concern developed in Britain about Napoleon's planned invasion of the United Kingdom. The British government's response took many forms including the reactivation of Fencible regiments and the Sea Fencibles, a program of the construction of Martello Towers along the coasts of Britain and Ireland, and the commissioning of a number of armed defense ships. 

The British East India Company in November voted to underwrite 10,000 tons (bm) of armed transports to protect Great Britain's coasts. The vessels were existing, but not EIC, merchantmen that would receive an upgrade in armament and in some cases a naval officer as captain. The vessels were: Albion, Aurora, Helder, Lord Nelson, Sir Alexander Mitchell, Suffolk, and Triton.

On 21 November 1803 Suffolk, of 362 tons (bm) and 16 guns, was ready but yet to be allocated to her station. The Royal Navy returned the armed defense ships to their owners by the second half of 1805.

In 1836 new owners, Richard Wilson and George Foggo, shifted her registry to Whitby. She was broken up in December 1844.

Note

Citations and references
Citations

References
 
 
  

1795 ships
Age of Sail merchant ships of England
Ships of the British East India Company